Forti is an Italian surname. Notable people with the surname include:

Anton Forti (1790–1859), Austrian operatic baritone
Carl Forti (born c. 1972), American political consultant
Ettore Forti (late 19th century - early 20th century), Italian Neoclassical painter
Giuseppe Forti (1939–2007), Italian astronomer
Guido Forti (1940–2013), Italian Formula One team founder and manager
Simone Forti (born 1935), American choreographer and musician

See also
Cesare Burali-Forti (1861–1931), Italian mathematician
Fortis (disambiguation)

Italian-language surnames